Horace Lloyd QC (August 1828 – 30 March 1874) was an English  barrister.

Background

He was the son of John Horatio Lloyd and Caroline Watson.

He was educated at University College, London, and Gonville and Caius College, Cambridge. He was called to the bar in the Middle Temple in 1852. He was appointed Queen's Counsel on 21 February 1868.

In 1873 Lloyd attracted unwanted attention when he was found guilty of an assault on John Henry Champion Coles in Cookham, Berkshire.

He died on 30 March 1874.

Family

He married Adelaide Barbara Atkinson, daughter of John Atkinson, in St Peter’s Church, Dublin on 28 August 1855, and they had two children:
Otho Holland Lloyd
Constance Mary Lloyd who married Oscar Wilde

Notes 

1828 births
1874 deaths
Alumni of Gonville and Caius College, Cambridge
19th-century King's Counsel